John Walker may refer to:

Politicians

American politicians
John Walker (Arkansas politician) (1937–2019), member of the Arkansas House of Representatives
John Walker (Missouri politician) (1770–1838), State Treasurer of Missouri
John Walker (Virginia politician) (1744–1809), U.S. Senator, public official, and soldier
SS John Walker, a Liberty ship 
John A. Walker (Iowa politician) (1912–2012), American politician
John M. Walker Jr. (born 1940), former chief judge of the U.S. Court of Appeals for the Second Circuit
John M. Walker (Pennsylvania politician) (1905–1976), Pennsylvania State Senator and lieutenant-gubernatorial nominee
John Randall Walker (1874–1942), U.S. Representative from Georgia
John Williams Walker (1783–1823), U.S. Senator from Alabama

Other politicians
John Walker (Australian politician) (1799–1874), member of the Tasmanian Legislative Council
John Walker (Canadian politician) (1832–1889), industrialist & Canadian House of Commons member
John Archibald Walker (1890–1977), lawyer and political figure in Nova Scotia, Canada
John Smith Walker (1826–1893), Minister of Finance of the Kingdom of Hawaii

Sportsmen

Association football
John Walker (footballer, born 1873) (1873–1937), Scottish international footballer (Hearts, Liverpool, Rangers)
John Walker (footballer, born 1878) (1878–1900), Scottish footballer (Leith Athletic, Hearts, Lincoln City)
John Walker (footballer, born 1899) (1899–1971), English footballer (Walsall, Stoke)
John Walker (footballer, born 1902), Scottish footballer (Hibernian, Swindon Town)
John Walker (footballer, born 1866) (1866–1921), Scottish footballer (Burnley)
John Walker (Grimsby Town footballer), Scottish football centre-half (Grimsby Town)
Jock Walker (1882–1968), Scottish footballer (Raith Rovers, Beith, Rangers, Swindon Town, Middlesbrough, Reading, Scotland)

Cricket
John Walker (cricketer, born 1768) (1768–1835), cricketer (brother of Tom and Harry Walker)
John Walker (cricketer, born 1826) (1826–1885), cricketer and the eldest brother of the Walkers of Southgate
John Walker (cricketer, born 1854) (1854–?), English cricketer
John Walker (Scottish cricketer) (1879–1953), Scottish cricketer

Other sports
John Walker (American football) (born 1983), former defensive back for the USC football team
John Walker (archer) (born 1974), British archer
John Walker (Australian footballer) (born 1951), Australian rules footballer for Collingwood
John Walker (cyclist) (1888–1954), British Olympic cyclist
John Walker (gymnast) (1883-1966), British Olympic gymnast
John Walker (rowing) (1891–1952), British coxswain and Olympic medalist
John Walker or Mr. Wrestling II (1934–2020), masked professional wrestler
John Walker (rugby league), rugby league footballer of the 1960s
Sir John Walker (runner) (born 1952), New Zealand runner, Olympic Gold medalist in 1500 metres run in 1976
John R. Walker (horse trainer), Canadian Horse Racing Hall of Fame horse trainer
John Reid Walker (1855–1934), British polo player and racehorse breeder

Entertainers and artists
John Walker (animator), television animator and director
John Walker (Australian actor) (fl. 1990s), Australian comedic actor
John Walker (curator) (1906–1995), director of the National Gallery of Art
John Walker (film producer) (born 1956), animated film producer
John Walker (filmmaker) (born 1952), Canadian filmmaker and cinematographer
John Walker (musician) (1943–2011), born John Maus, member of the 1960s singing group The Walker Brothers
John Walker (organist) (born 1941), recording artist
John Walker (painter) (born 1939), nominee for the Turner Prize in 1985
John Augustus Walker (1901–1967), Alabama Gulf Coast artist
John Edward Walker, British-born, American painter and educator
John Henry Walker (1831–1899), Canadian engraver and illustrator

Military personnel and spies
John Walker (RAF officer) (born 1936), former Chief of Defence Intelligence
John Walker (Medal of Honor) (1845–?), American Indian Wars soldier and Medal of Honor recipient
John Walker (officer of arms) (1913–1984), English officer of arms
John Anthony Walker (1937–2014), American communications specialist convicted in 1985 of spying for the Soviet Union
John C. Walker, Indiana physician and officer during the American Civil War
John George Walker (1821–1893), general in the Confederate States Army during the American Civil War
John Grimes Walker (1835–1907), United States Navy admiral
John T. Walker (USMC) (1893–1955), United States Marine Corp general

Inventors and scientists
John Walker (inventor) (1781–1859), English chemist and inventor of the friction match in 1827
John Walker (natural historian) (1731–1803), Scottish naturalist
John Walker (programmer) (born c. 1950), one of the designers of AutoCAD
John Charles Walker (1893–1994), American agricultural scientist
John E. Walker (born 1941), British chemist, winner of the 1997 Nobel Prize
John Francis Walker (1839–1907), British geologist
John James Walker (1825–1900), British mathematician
John M. Walker (1907–1990), American physician and investment banker
John Walker (horticulturist) (1893–1991), Canadian plant breeder

Businessmen
John Walker (grocer) (1805–1857), Scottish founder of John Walker & Sons and namesake of the Johnnie Walker whisky brand
John Walker (Scottish cricketer) (1879–1953), Scottish businessman and director of John Walker & Sons
John Brisben Walker (1847–1931), American entrepreneur and magazine publisher
John Hardeman Walker (1794–1860), southeast Missouri landowner

Clergymen
John Walker (archdeacon of Essex) (died 1588), Anglican archdeacon
John Walker (archdeacon of Dorset) (1694–1780)
John Walker (biographer) (1674–1747), English clergyman and ecclesiastical historian
John Walker (scholar) (1692–1741), English classical scholar and Anglican archdeacon of Hereford
John Walker (1769–1833), Church of Ireland cleric and academic who seceded as founder of a sect
John M. Walker (bishop) (1888–1951), Episcopal bishop of Atlanta
John Russell Walker (1837–1887), Anglican priest
John T. Walker (bishop) (1925–1989), American Episcopal bishop of Washington
John Walker (abolitionist) (1786–1845), Presbyterian minister in Ohio and Pennsylvania

Others
John Walker (industrialist) (1884–1932), Pittsburgh industrialist
John Walker (journalist) (born 1977), British video game journalist
John Walker (lexicographer) (1732–1807), English lexicographer, actor and philologist
John Walker (philatelist) (1855–1927), British philatelist
John Walker (numismatist) (1900-1964), Scottish numismatist
John Walker (vaccinator) (1759–1830), English educational writer, physician, and advocate of vaccination
John Brian Walker, British general practitioner
John Walker, one of the Birmingham Six accused of bombings in England in 1974
John A. Walker (art critic) (born 1938), British art critic and historian
John Clay Walker (1948–1985), American journalist
John H. Walker (1872–1955), Scottish-born American labor unionist and politician
John Walker (Protector of Aborigines), South Australian Protector of Aborigines, 1861–1868
John Walker of Beanston (1670-1728), Scottish agricultural improver - introduced the fallow system to Scotland in 1690.

Fictional characters
John Walker, in Arthur Ransome's Swallows and Amazons series of novels
John Walker, alter ego of U.S. Agent, a comic book superhero

See also

John Walker Lindh (born 1981), American captured as an enemy combatant in 2001, in Afghanistan, usually referred to by the press as John Walker
Johnnie Walker (disambiguation)
Jack Walker (disambiguation)
Jon Walker (born 1985), American musician
Jonathan Walker (disambiguation)

References